Ivy is a given name or surname taken from the name of the plant. It became popular as a given name in the late 1800s along with other plant and flower names for girls.  As a given name for girls, Ivy first entered the Top 200 in England and Wales in 1880, when it ranked #180, and reached the height of popularity when it was the 16th most popular name in England and Wales in 1904.  It has again risen in popularity and, as of 2020, Ivy was the sixth  most popular girls' name in England and Wales. It has also risen in popularity in other English speaking countries. 

Notable people with the name Ivy include:

Given name
 Ivy (Chinese singer) (born 1987), Chinese singer, rapper, dancer, and actress
 Ivy (Korean singer) (born 1982), South Korean singer, model and occasional actress
 Ivy Alvarez, award-winning Filipino Australian poet, editor, and reviewer currently residing in Wales
 Ivy Andrews (1907–1970), pitcher in Major League Baseball
 Ivy Austin (born 1958), American actress, singer, and voice-over artist
 Ivy Bean (1905–2010), British internet personality
 Ivy May Bolton (1879–1961), Anglican nun and writer
 Ivy Bottini (born 1926), American women's rights and LGBT rights activist
 Ivy Bregman (born 1995), Canadian former child actress known for her appearance in the children's series The Toy Castle
 Ivy Cavendish-Bentinck, Duchess of Portland, Duchess of Portland from 1943 to 1977 and afterwards Dowager Duchess
 Ivy Campany (1901–2008), at age 107, the second from last World War I female army veteran of any country
 Ivy Chen (born 1982), Taiwanese actress and commercial model
Ivy Compton-Burnett (1884–1969), English writer
 Ivy Cooke (1916–2017), Jamaican educator 
 Ivy Copeland (1888–1961), New Zealand artist and art teacher
 Ivy Duffy Doherty (1922–2008), Australian-American writer best known for her Young Adult fiction
 Ivy Duke (1896–1937), British actress
 Ivy Fife (1905–1976), New Zealand painter
 Ivy Gibbs (1866–1966), trans-Tasman poet and children's writer based pre-dominantly in New Zealand
 Ivy Griffin (1896–1957), first baseman in Major League Baseball from 1919 to 1921 for the Philadelphia Athletics
 Ivy Gunter (born 1950), amputee, fashion model, osteosarcoma survivor, inspirational speaker, and fitness enthusiast
 Ivy Ho, Hong Kong screenwriter and film director
 Ivy Jo Hunter, songwriter, record producer and singer, known for his work for the Motown label in the 1960s
 Ivy Joe Hunter (born 1966), former professional American football player
 Ivy Kellerman Reed (1877–1968), American author in the international language Esperanto
 Ivy Frances Klein (1895–1972), British composer
 Ivy Lee (1877–1934), considered by some to be the founder of modern public relations
 Ivy Liu, Taiwanese and New Zealand statistician
 Ivy Matsepe-Casaburri (1937–2009), South African politician, Minister of Communications from 1999 until her death
 Ivy Meeropol (born 1968), director and producer of the 2004 documentary Heir to an Execution
 Ivy Olson (1885–1965), Major League Baseball shortstop for the Cleveland Naps (1911–14), Cincinnati Reds (1915) And Brooklyn Robins (1915–24)
 Ivy Parker (1907–1985), American chemist and engineer
 Ivy Baker Priest (1905–1975), American political figure
 Ivy Quainoo (born 1992), Afro-German singer and winner of The Voice of Germany
 Ivy Rahman (1936–2004), Bangladeshi politician, Women's Affairs secretary of the Awami League
 Ivy Ruckman (born 1931), American author of books for children and young adults
 Ivy St. Helier (1886–1971), British stage actress, composer and lyricist
 Ivy Scott (1886–1947), stage actress
 Ivy Shore, Australian artist (painter)
 Ivy Tan, Singaporean radio personality
 Ivy Tresmand (1898–1980), English soubrette who appeared mostly in musical theatre
 Ivy Troutman (1884–1979), Broadway actress
 Ivy Walker (born 1911), English athlete who competed in the 1930 Women's World Games and the 1934 British Empire Games
 Ivy Wallace (1915–2006), British artist, actress and author, best known for writing the Pookie series of illustrated children's stories
 Ivy Weber (1892–1976), Australian politician
 Ivy Wedgwood (1896–1975), Australian Senator for Victoria
 Ivy Williams (1877–1966), first woman to be called to the English bar in 1922
 Ivy Williamson (1911–1969), player and coach of American football and basketball, and a college athletics administrator
 Ivy Winters, American drag performer

Fictional characters
 Ivy Tilsley, a character from Coronation Street portrayed by Lynne Perrie
 Ivy Valentine, a character from the Soulcalibur series of video games
 Poison Ivy, a character from the Batman franchise
 Ivy Aberdeen, a character from the book Ivy Aberdeen's Letter to the World by Ashley Herring Blake
 Ivy, a character from the 1990s animated television series Where on Earth is Carmen Sandiego?
 Ivy Wentz, a supporting character from the 2010 Disney Channel sitcom Good Luck Charlie
 Ivy Sundew, a supporting character from the 2019 Disney Channel animated series Amphibia
 Ivy, a playable character in the video game Fire Emblem Engage

Surname
 Andrew Conway Ivy (1893–1978), American doctor
 Bill Ivy (1942–1969), British motorcycle racer
 Bob Ivy, American stunt performer
 Corey Ivy (born 1977), American football player
 Cotton Ivy (1930–2021), American politician
 Gregory Ivy (1904–1985), American art professor
 Hardy Ivy (1779–1842), American settler
 Julie Ivy, American health care statistician
 Khori Ivy (born 1978), American football player
 Mortty Ivy (born 1986), American football player
 Pop Ivy (1916–2003), American football player and coach
 Veronica Ivy, Canadian  transgender rights activist

See also
 Ivey (name), includes a list of people with the surname or given name

References

English feminine given names
English masculine given names
English-language unisex given names
Given names derived from plants or flowers